Mohammad Ali Kushki (also Romanized as Moḥammd ʿAlī Kūshkī; also known as Chāh Shūreh-ye Vosţá) is a village in Tarhan-e Gharbi Rural District, Tarhan District, Kuhdasht County, Lorestan Province, Iran. At the 2006 census, its population was 222, in 39 families.

References 

Towns and villages in Kuhdasht County